In mathematics, a nonempty collection of sets is called a -ring (pronounced sigma-ring) if it is closed under countable union and relative complementation.

Formal definition 

Let  be a nonempty collection of sets. Then  is a -ring if:
 Closed under countable unions:  if  for all 
 Closed under relative complementation:  if

Properties 

These two properties imply:

whenever  are elements of  

This is because

Every -ring is a δ-ring but there exist δ-rings that are not -rings.

Similar concepts 

If the first property is weakened to closure under finite union (that is,  whenever ) but not countable union, then  is a ring but not a -ring.

Uses 

-rings can be used instead of -fields (-algebras) in the development of measure and integration theory, if one does not wish to require that the universal set be measurable. Every -field is also a -ring, but a -ring need not be a -field.

A -ring  that is a collection of subsets of  induces a -field for  Define  Then  is a -field over the set  - to check closure under countable union, recall a -ring is closed under countable intersections. In fact  is the minimal -field containing  since it must be contained in every -field containing

See also

References 

 Walter Rudin, 1976. Principles of Mathematical Analysis, 3rd. ed. McGraw-Hill. Final chapter uses -rings in development of Lebesgue theory.

Measure theory
Families of sets